Nizel Fernandes (born 3 January 1977) is an Indian-born cricketer who played for the United Arab Emirates national cricket team. He has played one One Day International for the United Arab Emirates.

External links 
CricketArchive
Cricinfo

1977 births
Living people
United Arab Emirates One Day International cricketers
Emirati cricketers
Cricketers from Mumbai
Indian emigrants to the United Arab Emirates
Indian expatriate sportspeople in the United Arab Emirates